The 2017–18 Holy Cross Crusaders men's basketball team represented the College of the Holy Cross during the 2017–18 NCAA Division I men's basketball season. The Crusaders, led by third-year head coach Bill Carmody, played their home games at the Hart Center in Worcester, Massachusetts as members of the Patriot League. They finished the season 12–19, 8–10 in Patriot League play to finish in sixth place. In the Patriot League tournament, they defeated Navy in the quarterfinals before losing to Colgate in the semifinals.

Previous season
The Crusaders finished the 2016–17 season 15–17, 9–9 in Patriot League play to finish in fifth place. In the Patriot League tournament, they lost in the quarterfinals to Navy.

Roster

Schedule and results

|-
!colspan=9 style=|Non-conference regular season

|-
!colspan=9 style=|Patriot League regular season

|-
!colspan=9 style=| Patriot League tournament

References

Holy Cross Crusaders men's basketball seasons
Holy Cross
Holy Cross Crusaders men's basketball
Holy Cross Crusaders men's basketball